The Snake River Ranch, near Wilson, Wyoming, is the largest deeded ranch in the Jackson Hole area. The ranch buildings are grouped into three complexes comprising headquarters, residential and shop complexes. The ranch combined two neighboring homesteads and was first owned by advertising executive Stanley B. Resor and his wife, Helen Lansdowne Resor. The Resors used the property as a vacation home, but the ranch was also a full-time, self-sustaining operation.

The ranch could produce its own food, water and electricity. It became significant for the Resors' employment of notable architects, include Mies van der Rohe, and the wide variety of celebrity visitors it attracted. The Snake River Ranch was listed on the National Register of Historic Places in 2004.

History
The Resors' primary home was in Greenwich, Connecticut, convenient to the JWT offices in New York City. In 1929 Stanley and Helen's twelve-year-old son Stanley Rogers Resor spent part of the summer in Jackson Hole with the Huyler family, who had bought a ranch on the Snake River. The younger Stanley's enthusiasm about his experience led his father to buy  of land, sight unseen. The entire family arrived in 1930 to see one pre-existing cabin, a barn, and what would become known as the One-Room Cabin and the Parking Lot Cabin. The family was enthusiastic about the ranch, tempered by Helen's preference for New York. To begin expanding the ranch the Resors hired architect Paul Colborn of New Canaan, Connecticut, to design a new main house. Work was well under way by the end of the summer, and Colborn ended up buying land for himself as well, which became known as the Aspen Ranch. The Resor property reputedly had the first flush toilets in Jackson Hole, as well as electricity generated on site.

Stanley Resor became enthusiastic about building a functioning ranch operation. During 1931 Resor established the ranch as a self-sustaining unit. He pulled down the old barn and hired landscape architect Isabelle Pendleton to lay out the headquarters complex. In 1933 a water wheel was added to the side of the ranch's pumphouse, which proved troublesome when it froze in the winter. In 1938 a Fitz turbine was installed in its place, to provide electricity, and was not retired until 1955. In the late 1930s the ranch infrastructure was further developed with the building of the shop complex.

Mies van der Rohe
In 1936 the Resors built the White Cabin for guest quarters. The White Cabin was designed by Philip Goodwin, who worked with Edward Durrell Stone on the Museum of Modern Art, and was on the board of directors of MOMA along with Helen Lansdowne Resor. The cabin's white interior lent it its name. Soon after, Helen asked architect Mark Peters, a relative of one of the younger Resor's school classmates, to "design a building in the style of Le Corbusier". The dining room, as it was called, was to span the mill stream, the arm of the Snake River that fed the power turbine, resting on four concrete piers. At some point Helen Resor lost confidence in the Peters design and sought another architect. She apparently turned to MOMA director Alfred Barr for advice. As a result of internal divisions within the MOMA board, which was divided between a faction led by Abby Rockefeller who supported Stone and Goodwin for the new MOMA building and a faction led by Barr and Resor who supported Ludwig Mies van der Rohe, Helen Resor hired Mies to complete the dining room, his first project in the United States. The Resors also considered Walter Gropius but settled on Mies as a more practical choice. In summer 1937 the Resors met Mies in Paris, and he accompanied them back across the Atlantic for his first trip to the United States, stopping in Chicago before going on the Wyoming. Mies stayed in the White Cabin, sharing it for a time with artist Grant Wood, a figurative painter of American themes. Mies stayed for two months before moving back to Chicago to be offered the directorship of the Armour Institute of Technology.

Back in Chicago, Mies developed elaborate plans for a two-story building connecting the banks of the stream using long floor-to-ceiling windows.  The only concession Mies made to the Western aesthetic of the ranch was to use wood to clad the building, for the first and only time in his career. However, rather than the Resors' preferred local lodgepole pine, Mies settled on cypress. Mies did choose to use local fieldstone for the ground-level walls, the fireplace and central stairs. By March 1938, Mies was returning to Germany on the  RMS Queen Mary when he received notice from Stanley Resor that the project was canceled, citing "business conditions". Resor suggested that the project might continue if Mies returned to the United States and worked with an American architect familiar with American construction practices. The project was projected to cost more than twice its budget, and there were technical difficulties with the proposed glazing. By fall 1938, Mies had returned to Chicago and had resumed work on the project, scaling it back somewhat, but it was finally canceled. Whatever the outcome of the design work at the Resors' ranch, the project played a significant role in Mies' departure from Germany just prior to the outbreak of war with a regime that was hostile to Modernist architecture.

Ranch operations
Stanley Resor developed the ranch into an efficient operation that could run without his direct management.

A major flood in 1943 was the result of water unexpectedly released by Jackson Lake Dam. The piers for the proposed dining room were upset. Had the dining room addition been built, it would have been damaged or destroyed. As a result of the flood Resor, on the advice of Arthur Ernest Morgan, consulted with engineer C.C. Chambers, who designed a dike system for the ranch. The dike project was hampered by a wartime labor shortage, which affected ranch operations as well. Resor increasingly mechanized the ranch as a result.

By the time of Stanley Resor's death in 1962, the operation was mature. The ranch remains in the Resor family.

Description
The ranch is functionally divided into three sections.

Shop complex
The shop complex is at the north end of the site. The complex is the location of the headgate inlet from the Snake River to the ranch's irrigation ditch. Structures include the
 Cowboy Barn (Harnessing Barn) 1931-1937
 Scale House
 Dipping Vat, late 1930s
 Snake River Dike and Heagate, constructed after flooding in 1943
 Calving Barn (Vet Shack)
 Fuel Shed (Turkey Coop), early 1930s

Ranch Headquarters Complex
The ranch headquarters complex is the next compound to the south and is arranged in a rectangle around a central open area. The site and buildings were designed by architect Isabelle Pendleton to frame a view of the Teton Range.
 Root Cellar
 Potting Shed
 Blacksmith Shop Office (Bunkhouse) (1935, rebuilt in the 1970s after a fire, non-contributing due to recent construction compared to other elements)
 Woodshed (Coal House)
 Manager's House, 1931
 Ice House, 1933
 Milk House, 1931
 Turbine House and Dam, 1938
 Penthouse (Old Shop and Bunkhouse). 1943
 Main Barn, 1931
 Saddle HouseResidential Complex
The southernmost group of buildings was used for family and guest quarters.
 Main Cabin, designed by Paul Colborn
 Kitchen Cabin, 1916–1917, expanded 1930s and 1960s.
 White Cabin, 1936, designed by Philip L. Goodwin
 Parking Lot Cabin, 1930
 Swimming Pool, circa 1936
 Mies van der Rohe building piers', intended to support a dining room spanning the mill stream designed by Ludwig Mies van der Rohe. The piers were to support a two-story structure. The building project was halted in 1938 and damaged by flooding in 1943.

Notable visitors

Peter Blume
George H. W. Bush (at about age 17)
Lawrence Ferlinghetti
Allen Ginsberg
Herbert Hoover (post-presidential)
Peter Hurd
Ludwig Mies van der Rohe
Charles M. Rose
Valentino Sarra
Grant Wood
Benjamin E. Levi and Daniel F. Levi, sons of John G. Levi

Conservation
In December 2007 the Hauge, Laughlin and Resor families donated conservation easements totaling  on the north side of Munger Mountain to the Jackson Hole Land Trust, adjoining a previous  easement. The lands came from the Lower Snake River Ranch property. The family has also negotiated with the National Park Service to sell  of inholdings to Grand Teton National Park.

See also
Bar B C Dude Ranch, directly across the Snake River

References

External links
Grand Teton Historic Resource Study: Tourists National Park Service
 at the National Park Service's NRHP database
Snake River Ranch Historic District at the Wyoming State Historic Preservation Office

Buildings and structures completed in 1929
Buildings and structures in Teton County, Wyoming
Ranches on the National Register of Historic Places in Wyoming
Resor family residences
Historic districts on the National Register of Historic Places in Wyoming
National Register of Historic Places in Grand Teton National Park
1929 establishments in Wyoming